Nipawan Panyosuk (born 15 March 1995) is a Thai footballer who plays as a midfielder for Women's League club Chonburi WFC. She has been a member of the Thailand women's national team.

International goals

References

1995 births
Living people
Women's association football midfielders
Nipawan Panyosuk
Nipawan Panyosuk
Nipawan Panyosuk
Nipawan Panyosuk